Flagstaff railway station is an underground station on the metro network in Melbourne, Australia. It is one of three stations on the underground City Loop, which runs through the Melbourne CBD. The station takes its name from the nearby Flagstaff Hill, a significant site in Melbourne's early history, and services Melbourne's legal district. It runs under La Trobe and William Streets, near the north western corner of the CBD.

In 2017/18, it was the sixth busiest station on Melbourne's metropolitan network, with 4.75 million passenger movements. Flagstaff station commenced opening on weekends and public holidays from 1 January 2016 – it was previously the only station in Melbourne to be closed on weekends and public holidays due to its proximity to business-related buildings such as the Commonwealth Law Complex, banks and major office buildings.

History
The station was constructed by mining methods, and has four levels to a maximum depth of 32 metres. The site was a geological "sandwich" of basalt in the arch area, Silurian mudstone bedrock in the lower half, and silt in the middle, which precluded the construction of lower and upper platforms as separately driven tunnels.

Instead, the station platforms consist of two chambers linked by cross tunnels, each having two platforms on top of each other. The side of each chamber was made up of two drift tunnels, one at the top and one at the bottom. These were then linked together by 228 vertically raise bored shafts, 1 metre in diameter and 3 metres apart. The shafts and drifts were then filled with concrete, and formed the side skeleton of the station chambers. The arch of each chamber was then constructed underground across the top of the two side walls, the material below the arch excavated down to the bottom of the side walls, and temporary cross struts added between the raise bored columns until the permanent elements were added. This innovative method resulted in a $1 million saving in construction costs (in 1975 dollars).

Flagstaff was the last station on the loop to open. Although trains had run through the station site since 24 January 1981 when the City Loop began operating, Flagstaff only opened to passengers on 27 May 1985. Initially, the City Loop did not operate at all on Sundays. That was changed with the introduction of Sunday trading, but at the same time that the other two underground loop stations opened on Sundays, Flagstaff station had its Saturday services cancelled.

In May 2017, CDC Melbourne operates one route 605 to Gardenvale from Flagstaff Station.

Facilities
The station is located under the intersection of La Trobe Street and William Streets and has two entrances - via lift or escalator south of La Trobe Street, and by stairs on the north. Flagstaff has three underground levels. The concourse level has a ticket office, ticket operated gates, toilets, a news stand and a hot snack shop. Flagstaff's four platforms are on the two levels below, with each level having an island platform. The levels are linked by elevators, 14 escalators and stairs. The four platforms serve a separate group of rail lines that leave the loop and radiate out into the city's suburbs.

Weekend opening campaign
In October 2012 it was revealed that traders and residents in the north-west area of the Melbourne CBD had begun a campaign to have Flagstaff station opened on weekends, arguing that its closure had a deadening effect on the life of the area. A petition calling for the station's weekend opening, only collected about 150 signatures in the first week.

With a number of residential developments having been built, the station was scheduled to open on weekends from June 2015, with both political parties having committed to this in the 2014 State Government Election. This was however deferred until January 2016.

Transport links

Platforms & services
Platform 1 - Clifton Hill Group:
 all stations and limited stops services to Mernda
 all stations and limited stops services to Hurstbridge

Platform 2 - Caulfield Group:
 express services to Pakenham via Flinders Street
 express services to Cranbourne via Flinders Street

Platform 3 - Northern Group:
 all stations services to Craigieburn
 all stations services to Upfield
 all stations and limited stops services to Sunbury
Customers for Werribee or Williamstown servies change at Flinders Street, Southern Cross or North Melbourne

Platform 4 - Burnley Group:
 all stations and limited stops services to Lilydale
 all stations and limited stops services to Belgrave
 all stations and limited stops services to Glen Waverley
 weekday shoulder peak all stations and limited stops services to Alamein

References

External links

Melway map at street-directory.com.au

Buildings and structures in Melbourne City Centre
Premium Melbourne railway stations
Railway stations in Australia opened in 1985
Railway stations in the City of Melbourne (LGA)
Railway stations located underground in Melbourne